Major-General James Murray Robert Harrison CB DSO (1 October 1880 – 30 December 1957) was a British Army officer who became Lieutenant Governor of Jersey.

Military career
Harrison was commissioned into the Royal Artillery in 1900 and served in the First World War.

After attendimg the Staff College, Camberley, he was appointed Commander Royal Artillery for the 55th (West Lancashire) Division in 1930, Commandant of the Royal School of Artillery at Larkhill in 1932, and Major-General Royal Artillery in India in 1935.

He went on to be General Officer Commanding 2nd Anti-Aircraft Division in 1936. In 1939, he became Lieutenant Governor of Jersey but held the role only until June 1940 when the island came under German occupation. He retired in 1941.

Family
In 1925, he married Stella Mary Travers-Smith.

References

Bibliography

External links
Generals of World War II

|-

1880 births
1957 deaths
Military personnel from Montgomeryshire
British Army generals of World War II
Companions of the Order of the Bath
Companions of the Distinguished Service Order
Royal Artillery officers
Governors of Jersey
British Army personnel of World War I
British Army major generals
Graduates of the Staff College, Camberley